Rhytiphora mista is a species of beetle in the family Cerambycidae. It was described by Newman in 1842. It is known from Australia.

References

mista
Beetles described in 1842